Phantasm may refer to:

 Apparitional experience, an anomalous experience, quasi-perceptual experience
 Ghost, the disembodied soul or spirit of a dead person or animal

Film
 Don Coscarelli's Phantasm film series (1979-2016)
 Phantasm (film), a 1979 horror film
 Phantasm II (1988)
 Phantasm III: Lord of the Dead (1994)
 Phantasm IV: Oblivion (1998)
 Phantasm: Ravager (2016)
 Batman: Mask of the Phantasm (1993)

Music
 Phantasm (music group), a viol consort
 Phantasm (band), a thrash metal band from Los Angeles
 Phantasm (FES), alias for Yui Sakakibara

Video games
 Avenging Spirit, an arcade game known as Phantasm in Japan
 Phantasmagoria (video game), a puzzle game released as Phantasm in Japan

Other uses
 Andrea Beaumont aka Phantasm, a fictional DC Comics supervillain and antiheroine
 Danny Chase (Phantasm), a short-lived member of the New Teen Titans
 "Phantasms" (Star Trek: The Next Generation), an episode

See also
 Phantasmagoria (disambiguation)
 Phantom (disambiguation)
 Fantasmagorie (disambiguation)